Mary Green may refer to:

Dame Mary Green (headteacher) (1913–2004), English head of first comprehensive school in London
Mary Green (journalist), British radio and television presenter
Mary Green (sprinter) (1943–2022), British Olympic sprinter
Mary Green (painter) (1766–1845), English painter
Mary Ann Green (1964–2017), American tribal leader and politician
Mary Anne Everett Green (1818–1895), English historian
Mary Hayden Pike (1824–1908), née Green, American author
Mary Jane Green, Confederate spy and bushwhacker
Mary Letitia Green (1886–1978), British botanist and bibliographer
Mary-Pat Green (born 1951), American actress
Mary Ann Ashford (1787–1870), English cook, married Edward Green
Mary Cozens-Walker married name Mary Green, (1938–2020) English textile artist and painter 
Marygreen, a fictional village in Thomas Hardy's novel Jude the Obscure, inspired by Fawley, Berkshire

See also
Mary Greene (disambiguation)
Green (surname)